Doa is a genus of moths of the Doidae family.

Species
Doa ampla (Grote, 1878)
Doa cubana Schaus, 1906
Doa dora Neumoegen & Dyar, 1894
Doa raspa Druce, 1894
Doa translucida Dognin, 1910

References 

Doidae
Ditrysia genera
Moth genera